Hans Larwin (December 6, 1873 – 17 November 1938) was a Viennese genre painter and academician.

Life
Larwin was the son of bookbinder Johann Larwin and his wife Karoline (née Veihinger). He attended at a Kunstgewerbeschule (Austrian vocational arts school) in Vienna and studied from 1889 at the Academy of Fine Arts. He studied under such artists as Christian Griepenkerl in 1891, from 1893 with August Eisenmenger and from 1894 with Kazimierz Pochwalski.

Around 1900, Larwin undertook numerous study trips to Rome, Munich, Paris, and the Netherlands. In 1902 he became a member of the Vienna Künstlerhaus gallery, and had his first exhibitions there. He was also a member of the "Alte Welt" artists' association. During World War I, he was involved as an official war painter on various fronts for the Austria-Hungary dual monarchy.

After a stay in Chicago (1922–24) Larwin lived between 1925 and 1927 in Slovakia, Hungary, and Yugoslavia. In 1927 he returned to Vienna, where he became professor and director of the general painting school at the Vienna Academy of Fine Arts in 1930.

His patron was Jenny Mautner (1856–1938) and her husband, Isidor Mautner (1852–1930), the owners of the  since 1925.

His grave is located at the Vienna Central Cemetery.

Awards
Throughout his career he received many awards.
1898: Rompreis (state travel scholarship)
1907: Little Golden State Medal; for his oil painting Branntweiner
1908: Imperial Prize; for his oil painting Sonntagabend in Neustift (Sunday evening in Neustift)
1910: Archduke Carl Ludwig Medal; for his oil painting Beim Heurigen (At Heurigen)
1913: Great Golden State Medal; for his oil painting Wiener Stadtratssitzung under Lueger (Vienna City Council meeting under Lueger)
1914: Friedrich Dobner of the Dobenau Prize; for his oil painting Nach der Assanierung in Erdberg(After mating in Erdberg)
1915: Prize of the City of Vienna
1926: State Prize
1927: 
1953: Larwingasse in the 22nd municipal district of Donaustadt was named after him

Works

Hans Larwin was known mainly as a genre painter of the Viennese suburbs and scenes from the Viennese national life, but also created portraits. His favorite techniques were oil and pastel painting as well as drawing.

Branntweiner, 1907.
Sitzung des Wiener Stadtrats unter Lueger, 1907 (Vienna Museum).
Beim Heurigen, 1910.
Illustrationen für den ersten Band der bekannten Kremser-Alben, 1911.
Nach der Assanierung in Erdberg, 1914.
Soldat und Tod, 1917, Museum of Military History, Vienna
Zigeunerin mit Zwillingen, 1920s, Art Institute of Chicago?

See also

List of painters from Austria

Bibliography 
Notes

References

 - Total pages: 700
  
 - Total pages: 604 

  
 - Total pages: 256

 
1873 births
1938 deaths
20th-century Austrian painters
20th-century male artists
Modern painters
Austrian portrait painters
World War I artists
Academy of Fine Arts Vienna alumni
Artists from Vienna
Academic staff of the Academy of Fine Arts Vienna
Burials at the Vienna Central Cemetery
Austro-Hungarian painters